White Corridors is a 1951 British drama film directed by Pat Jackson and starring Googie Withers, Godfrey Tearle, James Donald and Petula Clark. It is based on a novel by Helen Ashton. The film is set in a hospital shortly after the establishment of the National Health Service.

Premise
The day-to-day life of the staff and patients at a city hospital.

Cast
 Googie Withers as Dr. Sophie Dean
 James Donald as Dr. Neil Marriner
 Godfrey Tearle as Mr. Groom, Sr.
 Petula Clark as Joan Shepherd
 Jean Anderson as Sister Gater
 Timothy Bateson as Dr. Cook
 Fabia Drake as Miss Farmer
 Henry Edwards as Phillip Brewster
 Gerard Heinz as Dr. Macuzek
 Megs Jenkins as Mrs. Briggs
 Barry Jones as Dr. Shoesmith
 Avice Landone as Sister Jenkins
 Bernard Lee as Burgess
 Moira Lister as Dolly Clark
 Dandy Nichols as Char
 Basil Radford as Retired Civil Servant
 Bruce Seton as Policeman
 Mary Hinton as  Matron
 Patrick Troughton as Sailor
 Jack Watling as Dick Groom
 Philip Stainton as Sawyer
 Dana Wynter – first film role

Production
The film marked Googie Withers's return to acting after 13 months off following the birth of her child. John Mills at one stage was announced to play the male lead.

Bombardier Billy Wells, the man who bangs the gong on the Rank trademark, had a small role.

Pat Jackson claims making the film was "a joy" and says it was shot in five weeks.

Reception

Awards
At the 1951 BAFTAS it was nominated for Best Film and Best British Film. Petula Clark was nominated for Best Supporting Actress for her role.

Box office
White Corridors was the 8th most popular film at the British box office in 1951.

References

1951 films
1951 drama films
Films set in hospitals
Films shot at Pinewood Studios
British drama films
Films directed by Pat Jackson
British black-and-white films
1950s English-language films
1950s British films